First Love is a short story by Samuel Beckett, written in 1946 and first published in its original French version in 1970 and, in Beckett's English translation, in 1973.

The narrator tells of his discovery on a park bench (where he loitered after becoming homeless upon the death of his father) by a prostitute who takes him in, and of their strange "union," leading to the birth of a child and the narrator's abandonment of both.

In 2001, Romanian stage director Radu Afrim developed a version for the stage in Bucharest. Ralph Fiennes also performed an adaptation live at the Sydney Festival in 2007.

References

External links
 12 Book published by Calder

1973 short stories
Short stories by Samuel Beckett